Estate is a 2022 Indian Tamil-language horror drama film directed by Karthik Vilvakrish. The film stars Kalaiyarasan, Sunaina and Remya Nambeesan in the lead roles, with Ashok Selvan in an extended cameo. It was released on 9 December 2022.

Cast
Ashok Selvan as Micheal Devraj (extended cameo appearance)
Kalaiyarasan as Sasi
Sunaina as Reba
Remya Nambeesan as Durga Venugopal
Daniel Annie Pope
Kiran Konda
Vijay Vilvakrish
Raja Divagar
Arun
Radhakrishnan

Production
The film was shot completely in Yercaud in an only-night shoot schedule, with scenes filmed in abandoned vintage properties.

Release and reception
The film was released across Tamil Nadu on 9 December 2022. A critic from Times of India noted it was "a well-staged paranormal thriller let down by a poorly-written climax", adding that "Karthik V gets most of it right in like on kakoos person
Estate and manages to give us an immersive theatrical experience". A critic from Thanthi TV also gave the film a positive review.

References

External links

2022 films
2020s Tamil-language films